James Michael Quigley (March 30, 1918 – December 15, 2011) was a United States representative from Pennsylvania.

Background
James Quigley was born in Mount Carmel, Pennsylvania. He graduated from Villanova University in 1939 and from the Dickinson School of Law in Carlisle, Pennsylvania in 1942.

Career

World War II
He served in the United States Navy from 1943 to 1946, as a communications officer on the destroyer USS Hart (DD-594).  He was engaged in the Philippines campaign, 1944-45 and Battle of Okinawa campaigns, and after V-J Day served with the occupation forces in Korea and China.

Government service
Upon his return to the US, Quigley resumed his law practice in Harrisburg, Pennsylvania. He was unsuccessful as a Democratic candidate for election in United States House election, 1950. He was elected as a Democrat to the 84th United States Congress. He was an unsuccessful candidate in United States House election, 1956 and in 1957 he became the administrative assistant to Senator Joseph S. Clark of Pennsylvania, and assistant attorney general for Pennsylvania in 1958. He was elected to the 86th United States Congress in United States House election, 1958, but was an unsuccessful candidate for reelection in United States House election, 1960, losing to Republican George A. Goodling. He was appointed Assistant Secretary of Health, Education, and Welfare for Federal and State matters on February 24, 1961, serving until January 1966. He was appointed Commissioner of the Federal Water Pollution Control Administration serving from January 1966 to January 1968.

Private practice
He worked as vice president of the United States Plywood-Champion Papers, Inc., from 1968 to 1986.

Personal life and death
Quigley married Genevieve Morgan Quigley. They had six children. Their son, James M. Quigley Jr., predeceased them in 2007; five daughters survived.

He died on December 15, 2011, in Washington, D.C., and was interred at Gate of Heaven Cemetery in Silver Spring, Maryland.

References

External links

The Political Graveyard

1918 births
2011 deaths
Politicians from Harrisburg, Pennsylvania
People from Mount Carmel, Pennsylvania
Military personnel from Pennsylvania
United States Navy personnel of World War II
United States Navy officers
Villanova University alumni
Businesspeople from Pennsylvania
Pennsylvania lawyers
Democratic Party members of the United States House of Representatives from Pennsylvania
Burials at Gate of Heaven Cemetery (Silver Spring, Maryland)
20th-century American politicians
20th-century American naval officers
20th-century American businesspeople
20th-century American lawyers